Wietie was first published in 1980 by Christopher van Wyk and Fhazel Johennesse. The magazine provided a literary platform for the prevailing philosophy of Black Consciousness. It gave voice to a new generation of South African writers who saw their work not only as a critique on oppressive systems, but – like Black Power – as a weapon of transformation.

Content and themes
Wietie contained short stories, poems and artwork. The magazine employed a language that was both literary and defiant. Openly declaring its commitment to the 'communication of revolutionary writing,' while also providing a space to explore the realities of everyday life under apartheid, it published fiction, poetry and prose that challenged both the political, cultural and racial status. Combining wit and humour with openly political writing, Wietie did not survive long under the Apartheid administration.

Publishing
After the first issue was picked up by the police in February 1980, the censors banned it, first on the grounds of obscenity (specifically, they objected to the use of the word 'fuck' in the short story 'Aunt Molly and the Girls'), then on the grounds of sedition. After Wietie was forced to close down, Christopher van Wyk returned to Staffrider to become chief editor.

References

 Michael Chapman (ed), Soweto poetry, McGraw-Hill, Johannesburg; New York, 1982.
 Peter D. McDonald, The Literature Police: Apartheid Censorship and its Cultural Consequences, Oxford University Press, 2009

1980 establishments in South Africa
1980 disestablishments in South Africa
African and Black nationalism in Africa
Defunct literary magazines
Defunct political magazines
Defunct magazines published in South Africa
Magazines established in 1980
Magazines disestablished in 1980